Melike Pekel (born 14 April 1995) is a German-born Turkish footballer who plays as a forward for French Division 1 Féminine club Stade de Reims and the Turkey women's national team.

Early life
Melike Pekel was born to Turkish immigrant parents in München, Germany on 14 April 1995. After completing her vocational education in July 2015, she started to work as an optician in Schrobenhausen, Upper Bavaria, where she resides.

Club career

Pekel began her career in the youth team of FC Schrobenhausen in her hometown, and displayed her high footballer talent. In the 2012–13 season, she started to play for the second team of TSV Schwaben Augsburg in the German Bezirksoberliga Schwaben. Already after one game in the same season, she was promoted to the first squad of the club, which competed in the Regionalliga Süd. She scored in total 20 goals in 40 matches in two league seasons. Pekel became the topscorer of the Regionalliga Süd in the 2013–14 season.

For the 2014–15 season, FC Bayern München transferred her in the second team of the club to play in the 2. Bundesliga Frauen Süd. In the 12th play day of the season on 7 December 2014, manager Thomas Wörle took her into the first squad in the Bundesliga Frauen match against 1. FFC Frankfurt. She appeared in two games for the first squad until the end of the season. She enjoyed her team's champion title in the 2014–15 Bundesliga season. In the 2015–16 season, Pekel returned to her place in the second squad of the club playing in the 2. Frauen-Bundesliga Süd again. As of 22 November 2015, she scored 15 goals in 26 games for her club.

At the beginning of 2017, she left Munich and transferred to FC Metz-Algrange to play in the Division 1 Féminine. She made her debut in the away game against ASPTT Albi on 5 February 2017. Pekel scored her first and her team's only goal in the third minute in the home match against Olympique de Marseille on 26 February 2017.

Ahead of the 2017–2018 season Pekel joined Paris Saint-Germain. With her playing time limited, Pekel went on loan to Bordeaux in 2019.

In August 2019, Pekel re-signed with Metz.

International career

Pekel was called up to the Turkey women's national team, and debuted in the friendly match against Albania on 19 August 2015.

She took part in four of the UEFA Women's Euro 2017 qualifying Group 5 matches for the Turkish nationals. She appeared in three matches of the UEFA Women's Euro 2017 qualifying Group 5.
On 1 March 2017, Pekel scored her first national goal against Romania in the 2017 Goldcity Women's Cup.

She took part at the 2019 FIFA Women's World Cup qualification – UEFA preliminary round – Group 4 matches. In the second match of the tournament, she scored a hat-trick in the match against Luxembourg on 8 April 2017. She scored her team's only goal in the third game of the qualification tournament against Faroe Islands.

Career statistics

Club
.

International

Honours
 Frauen-Bundesliga
FC Bayern München
 Winners (1): 2014–15.

Individual
 Top Scorer: 2013–14 – Regionalliga Süd with TSV Schwaben Augsburg'' (16 goals)

References

External links

 
 Turkey player profile

1995 births
Living people
Citizens of Turkey through descent
Turkish women's footballers
Women's association football forwards
Division 1 Féminine players
FC Metz (women) players
Paris Saint-Germain Féminine players
FC Girondins de Bordeaux (women) players
Turkey women's international footballers
Turkish expatriate women's footballers
Turkish expatriate sportspeople in France
Expatriate women's footballers in France
Footballers from Munich
German women's footballers
German expatriate women's footballers
German people of Turkish descent
Frauen-Bundesliga players
2. Frauen-Bundesliga players
FC Bayern Munich (women) players
German expatriate footballers
German expatriate sportspeople in France
TSV Schwaben Augsburg players